Samba Almany Sow  (born 14 January 1984) is a retired professional football striker.

Career
Born in Dakar, Senegal, Sow previously played for AS Nancy-Lorraine in France's Ligue 2. He also had a spell with Akratitos in the Greek Beta Ethniki.

After a good season while playing for Thyella in the Greek third division, he was acquired by Panetolikos F.C. On 28 January 2008, in a game against Thiva F.C., he broke his tibia and fibula, which kept him out of action until the end of the 2007–08 season, when his contract expired.

References

1984 births
Living people
Footballers from Dakar
Association football forwards
Senegalese footballers
AS Nancy Lorraine players
R.E. Virton players
A.P.O. Akratitos Ano Liosia players
Thyella Patras F.C. players
Panetolikos F.C. players
US Raon-l'Étape players
Andrézieux-Bouthéon FC players
Senegalese expatriate footballers
Expatriate footballers in France
Senegalese expatriate sportspeople in France
Expatriate footballers in Greece
Senegalese expatriate sportspeople in Greece